XT may refer to:

Science and technology

Computing and electronics
 XT Mobile Network, a Telecom New Zealand mobile network
 IBM PC/XT, a personal computer
 XT bus architecture
 Crosstalk, an electrical interference caused by a wire carrying an electrical signal
 the XT versions of Radeon graphics cards
 XT (or XT[2]), a video server from EVS Broadcast Equipment
 XT XSLT, an implementation in Java of XSLT, created by James Clark
 X Toolkit Intrinsics or X toolkit, or Xt, a library providing an object-oriented-looking API for the X Window System
 Canon Digital Rebel XT, a digital single-lens reflex camera

Vehicles
 Ford XT Falcon, a car produced by the Ford Motor Company in Australia between 1968 and 1969
 Moyes XT, an Australian hang glider design
 Subaru XT, a sports car
 Yamaha XT 600 (and other XT versions), an enduro motorcycle

Other uses
 XT Brewing Company, an English Microbrewery
 XT (band), a Swedish metal band
 Extra time, in sport
 Cross-training, in sport
 Air Exel (IATA airline code XT)
 Christmas tree (oil well)
 Bop It! XT, a 2011 electronic game